Ahmed Abdul Basith (born 9 January 1942) is an Indian sailor. He competed in the Flying Dutchman event at the 1972 Summer Olympics.

References

External links
 
 

1942 births
Living people
Indian male sailors (sport)
Olympic sailors of India
Sailors at the 1972 Summer Olympics – Flying Dutchman
Place of birth missing (living people)